Popu Lady was a five-member Taiwanese girl group based in Taiwan, formed in 2012 by HIM International Music. The name of the group stands for "popular lady", which expresses the desire of the group to gain popularity through its songs and to give a girly and mature look at the same time.

History 
After training for a year in singing and dancing, Popu Lady debuted on December 14, 2012, with an extended play, Keep Keep Loving, and a homonymous song, being a cover of "Pretty Boy", originally recorded by the Norwegian female group M2M. Keep Keep Loving entered the top 10 best-selling chart in Taiwan when it hit the stores, and the title track's music video reached 200,000 views in six days and more than 800,000 after one month. In 2012, Popu Lady also sang "Feel Me" with Jiro Wang for TV series KO One Return soundtrack.

The group released a second EP, Popu Future, on September 13, 2013, and a third one titled More on August 22, 2014. It also sang "Honey" for the soundtrack of a TV series, Say I Love You. Popu Lady hosted a number of variety shows, including East Network Pop U Show from August 11, 2014, to July 17, 2015, and occasionally Love Blog. Many of its songs were featured in TV series, as Spring Love, Fall in Love with Me, and Go, Single Lady.

On August 7, 2015, the group released a digital single, "All About Him", for the official soundtrack of a 2015 feature film, Our Times. The lyrics edition of the music video was released three days later, while the official version was uploaded to the label official YouTube channel on October 20. The song ranked 24 on Billboard'''s China V Chart on December 12, 2015.

On September 23, 2015, HIM International Music launched the campaign "Get Out of Popu Lady" to eliminate a member of the group and make it more competitive on the market. For this purpose, an online poll was held from October 2 to November 20, 2015, to allow the public to vote one of the five members of the group out. At the same time, a reality called Get Out of Popu Lady Knockout was launched, in which the girls displayed their skills in a series of challenges to survive. Netizens believed the poll was merely a viral marketing technique to promote the group and called for its cessation, using the symbol "5-1 = 0"; furthermore, on October 15, 2015, the poll website was hacked and voting was temporarily blocked. The result of the poll was announced on November 22 during a promotional activity of the group's fourth extended play, Gossip Girls, released two days before. According to the announcement, as Dayuan and Yushan tied, none of the five members was removed from the group. The campaign has heavily been criticized by the public as being a fraud, saying such a result was predictable and unsurprising. On the other hand, Bao'er won the survival show and got the chance to release a solo EP.

In the meantime, four songs from Gossip Girls were released as singles: "Excuse Me" was released on September 28, 2015, "Popu OK Boom" on October 12, "Don't Say Goodbye" on October 27, with its music video the following day, and "Gossip Girls" on November 16. For its fourth extended play, Popu Lady changed their concept from cute and cheerful to sexy and dark; this reflects in the lead title track, a cover of German duo Symphobia's "I Do", which samples the Dance of the Little Swans from Pyotr Ilyich Tchaikovsky's Swan Lake. The music video was released on December 18 and the dance version on December 29. In November the group also featured in the soundtrack of Marry Me, or Not? with "Conquered Love".

On February 29, 2016, Popu Lady performed the closing act of Taipei's Lantern Festival; the members then embarked in solo activities, from musicals to television series. On September 29, the group released its first photobook, titled Thai HOT!. On March 7, 2017, Dayuan took a three-month hiatus to film the TV series Private Shusan College in Mainland China. Hongshi did the same on April 13 to shoot Siamese Password. In 2018, Bao'er and Yushan joined Chinese series Produce 101 and got eliminated on episode 4.

As of October 2019, Tingxuan's and Yushan's contracts with HIM International Music have expired, while Dayuan has left the company, and the five members continue their solo activities. In January 2021, with Hongshi, Bao'er and Yushan becoming YouTubers under a new company and using a new group name as a trio, the disbandement of Popu Lady was confirmed.

 Members 
 Hongshi (born January 7, 1988, as 洪詩涵 Hóng Shīhán) graduated in hotel management from Jinwen University of Science and Technology. She entered the entertainment industry in 2005 hosting music programs and being part of the audition show Blackie's Teenage Club. She signed with HIM International Music in 2011. In 2014, she appeared in the music video for Ben Wu's "Don't Cry" and starred in Taiwanese TV series Say I Love You. In 2015 she made a cameo on Love Cuisine as Maggie.
 Dayuan (大元, born November 14, 1989, as 林盈臻 Lín Yíngzhēn), the group leader, studied law at Fu Jen Catholic University, but left before graduating. She debuted in 2010 on the talk show University. In 2011, she published a personal photobook, Girl Friend - Vitality Girlfriend. She debuted as an actress in 2012, starring in TV series Spring Love in 2013 and Love or Spend in 2015.
 Bao'er (寶兒, born January 7, 1990, as 吳昀廷 Wú Yúntíng) graduated from the University of Kang Ning. She was a swimsuit model spotted during the show Unbeatable Youth in 2008.
 Tingxuan (born March 19, 1990, as 陳庭萱 Chén Tíngxuān) graduated from the National Kaohsiung University of Hospitality and Tourism in aeronautics and transportation service management system. In 2016 she appeared in the music video for Tian Yahuo's "Our Valentine's Day".
 Yushan (born June 8, 1991, as 劉宇珊 Liú Yǔshān) studied business at Chung Yuan Christian University. After appearing in Juksy's Street Watch, she debuted on the variety show University in 2011 and joined HIM International Music in 2012. In 2013, she appeared in the music video for Aaron Yan's "Taipei Dreamin'". In 2014, she sang "Marching Forward (Retro Version)" ( for a feature film, Dadaocheng''.

Discography

Extended plays

Digital singles

Music videos

Awards and nominations

References

External links 

  Official website

Mandopop musical groups
Taiwanese girl groups
Musical groups established in 2012
2012 establishments in Taiwan